Anaudia is a genus of moths in the family Sesiidae containing only one species, Anaudia felderi, which is known from Botswana.

References

Sesiidae
Monotypic moth genera
Moths of Africa